{{Infobox character
| name               = Kevin Malone
| series             = The Office
| image              = 
| caption            = 
| portrayer          = Brian Baumgartner
| creator       = Greg Daniels
 Ricky Gervais  Stephen Merchant  
| first              = "Pilot" (2005)
| last               = "Finale" (2013)
| occupation         = *Owner of an unnamed bar at the address 3030 Adams
Accountant, Dunder Mifflin, Scranton 
Temporary Receptionist, Dunder Mifflin
Drummer, ’Kevin and the Zits' 'Scrantonicity II (Ex-Scrantonicity)
| significant_others  = Stacy (ex-fiancé) Lynn (ex-girlfriend)
| nationality        = American
| franchise          = Kevin is also related to post Malone
| alt                = 
| first_major        = 
| first_minor        = 
| first_issue        = 
| first_date         = 
| last_major         = 
| last_minor         = 
| last_issue         = 
| last_date          = 
| firstgame          = 
| based_on           = Keith Bishop (British counterpart)
| adapted_by         = 
| voice              = 
| full_name          = 
| origin             = Scranton, Pennsylvania, United States
| home               = 
| color              = #89cff0
}}

Kevin Malone is a fictional character in the American television series The Office. He is portrayed by Brian Baumgartner. Kevin's counterpart in the UK TV series is Keith Bishop, who shares Kevin's lack of communication skills, musical interest, and obesity. In the series, Kevin is a part of the accounting department at the Scranton branch of Dunder Mifflin.

Slate magazine named the character as one of the reasons they were looking forward to the return of the show in late 2007.

Storylines
Seasons 1–2
Kevin is one of the more prominent supporting characters throughout the first season. In the episode "Basketball", while making a basketball team for a game against the warehouse employees, Michael ignores Kevin's plea to join the team. It is later revealed that Kevin is an excellent basketball player.

In season two, Kevin begins a relationship with Stacey, whom he later proposes to. Kevin is despondent on Valentine's Day when he doesn't know where she is, though in a deleted scene, he becomes very happy when she calls and states she's back in town. In "Take Your Daughter to Work Day", Kevin brings Stacey's daughter Abby to the office, where she quickly becomes pals with Jim.

In "Michael's Birthday", Kevin gets tested for skin cancer, which takes the mood away from party festivities, much to Michael's dismay. The results end up negative, though Michael mistakenly believes 'negative' means that his test revealed cancer. Later in the season, Jim and Pam encounter Kevin's The Police tribute band Scrantonicity, while searching for bands for Pam and Roy's wedding; Roy asks Kevin to play for the wedding, which Kevin initially accepts.

Seasons 3–4
In "Cocktails", Kevin is asked if he and Stacy have set a date for their wedding. Kevin says they have, but it is very complicated, hinting that they may have separated.

Kevin suffers a series of setbacks during the third season. In the episode "Money", Kevin announces that he has split from the band "Scrantonicity" and formed "Scrantonicity II". However, none of his coworkers come to support his new band. In "The Chair Model", Kevin is angered when the Dunder Mifflin employees are forced to park in a satellite parking lot, and he teams up with Andy in order to reclaim their parking spaces. Though Michael denies him the opportunity to call a meeting, Kevin and Andy decide to call a meeting with the bosses of the office park, and they are given the parking spaces back. Kevin is cheered up by the news, revealing that he's had a hard time because Stacy broke off their engagement.

In "Goodbye, Toby", Dwight pranks the office's new HR representative Holly Flax by telling her that Kevin is mentally challenged, and that he got his job at Dunder Mifflin through a special program.  Holly pays special attention to Kevin, praising him for doing simple tasks.  Kevin, however, interprets Holly's frequent praise and breathy condescension as sexual interest in him.

Seasons 5–6
At the beginning of the season, Holly still believes Kevin is mentally challenged. When Angela berates Kevin over a mistake he made, Holly steps in; Kevin reveals that he is not mentally challenged, which embarrasses Holly.

In "Blood Drive", Kevin meets a woman named Lynn, but is awkward when talking to her. Andy, Jim, and Pam give him greatly disparate advice on wooing her in "Golden Ticket", and ultimately he successfully asks her to dinner and a movie. They are later seen kissing passionately at Michael's "Cafe Disco". In a deleted scene, Kevin reveals that he and Lynn had broken up.

In "Casual Friday" Kevin brings a batch of his homemade chili (which he names "Kevin's Famous Chili") upstairs to the office, only to drop the pot, causing chili to spill all over the floor in front of Erin's desk. He desperately tries to clean up the mess, only to drench papers and binders in chili while spreading the food all over the carpet.

In "The Delivery", Michael attempts to set Kevin up with the new receptionist, Erin Hannon, telling Kevin that she is interested in him. When Erin tells Michael that she likes Andy, not Kevin, Michael rudely tells Kevin that he is not good enough to date Erin, infuriating and confusing Kevin.

In "Secretary's Day", the office are amused by a video Oscar makes that compares Kevin's voice to  Cookie Monster. Kevin reports the video to Gabe, but the office ignores Gabe's attempts to stop the mockery. Ultimately, Kevin ends up impersonating Gabe as well, which makes everybody laugh. At the end of the episode, Kevin makes a video of Oscar as The Count, with only Michael finding it funny.

Season 7–9
Following the holiday break, Kevin writes on Pam's "New Year's Resolution Board" for him to eat more vegetables. Later, Michael is upset that Holly did not stick to her ultimatum with A.J., projects his anger onto the rest of the office for not sticking to their resolutions; he forces Kevin to eat a stalk of broccoli. Michael later apologizes to Kevin for his actions, and Kevin readily forgives him. In "Todd Packer", Kevin is excited when he learns Todd Packer will be working at the office full-time, but upon his arrival at the office, Todd insults him. Visibly hurt, Michael later calls Kevin to the front of the office so Packer can apologize to him, though Packer's apology is insincere.

In "Goodbye, Michael", Michael's initial going-away present to Kevin is a caricature of Kevin as a pig sloppily eating a pizza. Michael rips it up, telling Kevin that he will eventually be thin and find love. Kevin informs Michael that he's okay with who he is now.

In "Trivia", Kevin tries to join the "A-team" for the trivia contest, which includes Andy, Jim, Darryl, and Ryan, only to be gently steered away from that group and into the "Hail Mary" team with the less intellectually imposing Kelly, Erin, and Meredith. To the astonishment of Andy and all of the other teams at the gay bar where the contest is taking place, the Hail Mary team in general and Kevin in particular prove to be excellent at answering obscure questions and win the $1,000 prize. Kevin speaks with pride about the achievement. However, in the episode's closing scenes, Kevin and the rest of his team try to win a higher-stakes trivia contest and fail miserably.

While Kevin is generally portrayed as a simple-minded and unsophisticated person, he is shown to exhibit remarkable astuteness, being one of the only staff members to notice Andy is suffering from a mental breakdown following his abrupt dismissal from Dunder Mifflin. Towards the end of the season, Kevin is revealed to have adopted an old and feeble dog, Ruby.

In "The Boat", Kevin overhears Oscar talking about kissing Angela's husband Robert.  When Oscar sees that Kevin heard, he goes to great lengths to ensure that Kevin keeps the secret. Later, in "Vandalism", Kevin and Oscar attend Angela's son's birthday party, where Kevin confronts Robert and accuses him of using Oscar and Angela to boost his political campaign.

In the series finale, Dwight mentions that he had fired Kevin shortly after the airing of the documentary; a later interview reveals that Kevin had been cooking the books at Dunder-Mifflin for the duration of the series, using the invented number "Keleven" to correct his myriad mathematical errors. During Dwight's bachelor party, Jim takes all of the current and past men from the office to a bar, where it is revealed that Kevin is the owner. When Kevin refuses them service and tells them to leave, Dwight tells Kevin that he was only fired because of his constant mistakes, and that he misses him and still considers him a friend. Kevin forgives Dwight and tells him that he misses him too. He is later seen attending Dwight and Angela's wedding.

 Webisodes 
The Accountants
During the time period between the second and third seasons, NBC posted The Accountants, a season of "webisodes" (online mini episodes) with Kevin, Oscar, and Angela attempting to solve an accounting error. The error ends up being the fault of Angela and when it is discovered, Kevin says it is the best day of his life.

Kevin's Loan
Throughout the summer between the fourth and fifth seasons, NBC's website featured a new season of webisodes entitled Kevin's Loan. The four online episodes detailed Kevin's attempts to find money in order to pay his gambling debt back to his bookmaker. Kevin settles on trying to get a small business loan under the auspices of selling ice cream. When his first attempt goes poorly, Darryl joins Kevin in making the proposal to another loan officer at the same bank and they bring a sample into the meeting. Darryl flirts with the female loan officer and asks her to "taste the ice cream". When she does, she remarks that it tastes like Breyer's. The first loan officer comes in and Darryl asks him to taste the ice cream. The loan officer asks if they made the ice cream or bought it in a store and Kevin throws a nervous fit, hissing at Darryl to abort their mission. The webisode season ends with Kevin selling ice cream outside of the office to pay back his debt. Stanley comes out to buy some but refuses to pay the ten dollar cost. And Kevin is seen with a sly smile turned to a slight frown.

Reception
Kevin became a fan-favorite due to his numerous quirks and optimistic outlook in life, though Screen Rant'' noted several inconsistencies with his character. His "spilled chili" scene became one of the most memorable moments on the show, with actor Brian Baumgartner paying homage to the scene in a real-life commercial for Bush's Baked Beans aired on National Chili Day.

References

Fictional accountants
Fictional gamblers
Fictional musicians
Fictional Irish American people
The Office (American TV series) characters
Television characters introduced in 2005
American male characters in television